Service bell may refer to:

 Call bell, a countertop bell used to summon an attendant to a service desk
 Servant bell, a bell used to call the attention of an in-house servant